Golan v. Saada, 596 U.S. ___ (2022), was a United States Supreme Court case concerning the Hague Convention on the Civil Aspects of International Child Abduction. The case reviewed if all ameliorative measures must be taken into consideration before denying a Hague Convention petition once it is found that the child could face harm when returned to a foreign country.

Background 

Isacco Saada and Narkis Golan were a couple that had married in Milan, Italy. During their marriage, Saada was abusive towards Golan and they often argued. Sometimes, during arguments, Saada would "push, slap, and grab Golan and pull her hair." Saada had made threats against Golan's life on an occasion. Much of these acts of abuse happened in front of their son, B.A.S.

In July 2018, Golan flew with her son B.A.S. to the United States to attend her brother's wedding, but instead of returning to Italy afterward, she found refuge in a domestic violence shelter. After he found out, Saada filed a criminal complaint in Italy and filed a petition under the Hague Convention and the International Child Abduction Remedies Act (ICARA) in the United States District Court for the Eastern District of New York.

Initially, the district court allowed B.A.S to return to Italy by seeking ameliorative measures, which included Saada providing Golan $20,000, dismissing his criminal complaint in Italy and seeking therapy, which was consistent with the United States Court of Appeals for the Second Circuit's precedent at the time. On appeal, however, the Second Circuit found the measures were insufficient in mitigating the risk and vacated the judgment.

On remand, the district court worked with the Italian Authorities to ensure that a protective order was filed against Saada to prevent Saada from approaching Golan and that social services in Italy oversaw Saada's therapy and parenting classes. The Second Circuit now affirmed.

Golan filed a petition for a writ of certiorari.

Supreme Court 

The court granted certiorari on December 10, 2021, and heard oral arguments on March 22, 2022. On June 15, 2022, the Supreme Court vacated the Second Circuit's judgment in a unanimous opinion written by Justice Sonia Sotomayor.

References

External links 
 

2022 in United States case law
United States Supreme Court cases
United States Supreme Court cases of the Roberts Court
Child custody
United States statutory interpretation case law
United States family case law
Italy–United States relations